Kyle is a town in Lacadena Rural Municipality No. 228, in the province of Saskatchewan, Canada. The town had a population of 423 in the 2006 Census. The village was named for its original settler, Jeremiah Kyle, in 1923. The Canada Post postal code for Kyle is S0L 1T0.

Demographics 

Attractions 
The town is well-known locally both for being the site of a 12,000-year-old woolly mammoth discovery during road construction in 1964 (the bones of which are now on display at the Royal Saskatchewan Museum in Regina), and being the nearest community to La Reata Ranch, a working cattle ranch that doubles as a resort and allows guests to experience a real cowboy lifestyle first-hand.

Near the town of Kyle is the Clearwater Lake Regional Park. On the road to it stands one of the last few Drive-in theaters in Western Canada, which remains a very popular evening attraction for both young and old in the summer months. That drive-in is one of the few remaining in Saskatchewan. The others include the Jubilee Drive-in Theatre in Manitou Beach, the Prairie Dog Drive-in Theatre in Carlyle, the Moonlight Movies Drive-in in Pilot Butte, and the Twilite Drive-in Theater in Wolseley.

See also
Kyle Airport
Matador Cooperative Farm

References

External links

Lacadena No. 228, Saskatchewan
Towns in Saskatchewan